The 2010 Novak Djokovic tennis season officially commenced on January 4 with the start of the 2010 ATP World Tour.

Yearly summary

Grand Slam performances

Australian Open 

Djokovic eased through the initial four rounds of the first Grand Slam of the year, dropping just one set to Marco Chiudinelli. In a repeat of the 2008 final, Djokovic faced Jo-Wilfried Tsonga in the quarter-finals. Tsonga "gained revenge with an absorbing – albeit error-strewn – victory against the third seed in a match lasting almost four hours." Djokovic had convincingly won the third set 6–1 but soon after left the court having told the umpire that he was about to vomit. After the medical time out, Djokovic returned to the court but "quickly found himself 5–0 down and never really recovered." Tsonga eventually progressed by way of a 7–6(8–6) 6–7(5–7) 1–6 6–3 6–1 victory. Despite the loss, Djokovic attained a career-high ranking of world no. 2.

Roland Garros 

Djokovic entered the French Open seeded third. He defeated Evgeny Korolev, Kei Nishikori, Victor Hănescu, and Robby Ginepri en route to the quarter-finals; his opponent there was Jürgen Melzer. No. 22 seed Melzer overcame Djokovic in 4 hours and 15 minutes with Djokovic having had a two sets to love advantage. Despite suffering from hayfever-like symptoms, Djokovic managed to save two match points before eventually relinquishing the match. It was the first time Melzer reached the last four of a Grand Slam event.

Wimbledon 

Again seeded third, Djokovic defeated Olivier Rochus, Taylor Dent and Albert Montañés to set up a fourth round encounter with former Wimbledon champion Lleyton Hewitt. Djokovic eventually progressed to his second Wimbledon semi-final against Tomáš Berdych, the Czech having upset Roger Federer in the previous round. "Djokovic had won both the previous matches between the two and as the world no. 3 was the higher-ranked player, far more experienced at this level, having played in six previous semi-finals." Nevertheless, Berdych overcame Djokovic in straight sets, setting up a final with Rafael Nadal.

US Open 

Djokovic came very close to losing in his opening round against Viktor Troicki in extreme heat. He then defeated Philipp Petzschner, James Blake and Mardy Fish, and number 17 seed Gaël Monfils, all in straight sets to reach the US Open semifinals for the fourth consecutive year. In the semifinals, Djokovic defeated Roger Federer in five sets after saving 2 match points with forehand winners while serving to stay in the match at 4–5 in the 5th set. It was Djokovic's first victory over Federer at the US Open in four attempts and his first victory over Federer in a Major since the 2008 Australian Open. Djokovic lost to Nadal in the final, a match that saw Nadal complete his career Grand Slam.

All matches 
This table chronicles all the matches of Djokovic in 2010, including walkovers (W/O) which the ATP does not count as wins. They are marked ND for non-decision or no decision.

Singles matches 

 Source

Doubles matches 

 Source

Exhibition matches

Tournament schedule

Singles schedule 

NOTE: In 2010 season total year-end points from ABN AMRO Tournament and Aegon Championships were not counted, as well as those from First Round, Quarterfinals and Semifinals of Davis Cup.

Doubles schedule

Yearly records

Head-to-head matchups 
Novak Djokovic had a  record against the top 10, a  against the top 50 and a  against players outside the top 50.

Ordered by number of wins

Finals

Singles: 4 (2–2)

Doubles: 1 (1–0)

Team competitions: 1 (1–0)

Earnings 
Novak Djokovic earned $4.3 million throughout the season.

Awards and nominations 
 Best Male Tennis Player in Serbia
 DSL Sport Golden Badge
 Best Sportsman by OCS

See also 
 2010 ATP World Tour
 2010 Roger Federer tennis season
 2010 Rafael Nadal tennis season

References

External links
  
 ATP tour profile

Novak Djokovic tennis seasons
Djokovic
2010 in Serbian sport